Virus, known in Japan as , is a 1980 Japanese post-apocalyptic science fiction film directed by Kinji Fukasaku. Based on Sakyo Komatsu's 1964 novel of the same name, the film stars an international ensemble cast featuring Masao Kusakari, Sonny Chiba, George Kennedy, Robert Vaughn, Chuck Connors, Olivia Hussey, Edward James Olmos, Glenn Ford, and Henry Silva.

At the time of its release, the film was the most expensive Japanese film ever made.

Plot
In 1982, a shady transaction is occurring between an East German scientist, Dr. Krause, and a group of Americans involving a substance known as MM88. MM88 is a deadly virus, created accidentally by an American geneticist, that amplifies the potency of any other virus or bacterium it comes into contact with. The Americans recover the virus sample, which was stolen from a lab in the US the year before, but the virus is accidentally released after the plane transporting it crashes, creating a pandemic initially known as the "Italian Flu".

Within seven months, virtually all the world's population has died off. However, the virus is inactive at temperatures below -10 degrees Celsius, and the polar winter has spared the 855 men and eight women stationed in Antarctica. The British nuclear submarine HMS Nereid joins the scientists after sinking a Soviet submarine whose infected crew attempts to make landfall near Palmer Station.

Several years later, as the group is beginning to repopulate their new home, it is discovered that an earthquake will activate the Automated Reaction System (ARS) and launch the United States nuclear arsenal.

The Soviets have their own version of the ARS that will fire off their weapons in return, including one targeting Palmer Station. After all of the women and children and several hundred of the men are sent to safety aboard an icebreaker, Yoshizumi and Major Carter embark aboard the Nereid on a mission to shut down the ARS, protected from MM88 by an experimental vaccine.

The submarine arrives at Washington, D.C., and Yoshizumi and Carter make a rush for the ARS command bunker. However, they reach the room too late, and Carter dies in the rubble of the earthquake, deep in the bunker. Yoshizumi contacts the Nereid and tells them to try to save themselves, adding that the vaccine seems to have worked “If that still matters”. “At this point in time, life still matters,” the captain replies, telling Yoshizumi to stay where he is: He might be safe.

Washington is hit by a bomb, and the screen fills with atomic bomb after atomic bomb exploding. From there the movie's ending diverges based upon the two cuts. In the American version, the screen goes black for a moment, and the end credits roll over footage of the Antarctic and a poignant song sung by a lone woman’s voice. The refrain is, “It’s not too late...” In the Japanese version, Yoshizumi survives the blast and walks back towards Antarctica. Upon reaching Tierra del Fuego in 1988, he finds survivors from the icebreaker, immunized by a since-developed vaccine. He reunites with the woman he fell in love with, they embrace, and Yoshizumi declares "Life is wonderful."

Cast
 Masao Kusakari as Dr. Shûzô Yoshizumi
 Tsunehiko Watase as Yasuo Tatsuno
 Sonny Chiba as Dr. Yamauchi
 Kensaku Morita as Ryûji Sanazawa
 Toshiyuki Nagashima as Akimasa Matsuo
 Glenn Ford as President Richardson
 George Kennedy as Admiral Conway 
 Robert Vaughn as Senator Barkley 
 Chuck Connors as Captain McCloud 
 Bo Svenson as Major Carter
 Olivia Hussey as Marit
 Henry Silva as General Garland
 Isao Natsuyagi as Commander Nakanishi
 Stephanie Faulkner as Sarah Baker
 Stuart Gillard as Dr. Edward Meyer
 Cec Linder as Dr. Latour
 George Touliatos as Colonel Rankin
 Chris Wiggins as Dr. Borodinov
 Edward James Olmos as Captain Lopez
 Colin Fox as Agent Z
 Ken Pogue as Dr. Krause
 Alberta Watson as Litha

Background and production
In the 1970s, producer Haruki Kadokawa formed the Kadokawa Production Company. Its releases included Kon Ichikawa's The Inugamis and Junya Sato's Proof of the Man, with the latter having American cast members such as George Kennedy. Kadokawa began to develop films that were often based on literary properties held by Kadokawa's publishing arm.

The domestic box-office for these films was large, which led to Kadokawa putting US$16 million into the film Virus, making it the most expensive film in Japanese history on its release. The film was shot on location in Tokyo and various locations throughout Canada, including Kleinburg, Ottawa, and Halifax. The production was heavily supported by the Chilean Navy, who lent the submarine Simpson (SS-21) for use as a filming location. Submarine interiors were filmed on-board HMCS Okanagan (S74), an Oberon-class vessel that served in the Canadian Forces.

During filming, a Swedish cruiser used to transport crew was heavily damaged by a coral reef off the Chilean coast, and had to be rescued by the Navy.

Janis Ian wrote the lyrics to the song "Toujours Gai Mon Cher (You Are Love)" and performs it.  In the closing credits, it is erroneously listed as "Tourjours Gai Mon Cher".  The music was produced by Teo Macero.

Release
Virus was released theatrically in Japan on 28 June 1980 where it was distributed by Toho.

The American version of the film was shown for review at the Cannes Film Festival in May 1980 as a "work-in-progress" print. The non-English language footage was dubbed into English for this release and it ran at 155 minutes. It was initially released to home video in the United States with a 108-minute run-time and was presented on television with a 93-minute running time. The original Japanese-language cut was released to home video in 2006 with English subtitles.

See also
 12 Monkeys
 Contagion
 Outbreak
 Doomsday device

References

Sources

External links
 

 (full length edit) 
 (short edit)
 (full original cut)

1980 films
1980s disaster films
1980s science fiction thriller films
English-language Japanese films
Films about nuclear war and weapons
Films about viral outbreaks
Films based on Japanese novels
Films based on science fiction novels
Films directed by Kinji Fukasaku
Films set in 1982
Films set in 1983
Films set in 1988
Films set in the future
Films set in Antarctica
Films set in East Germany
Films set in Kazakhstan
Films set in Maryland
Films set in Tokyo
Films set in the United States
Films set in the White House
Films shot in Alaska
Films shot in Nova Scotia
Films shot in Antarctica
Films shot in Peru
Japanese disaster films
Japanese science fiction thriller films
1980s Japanese-language films
Japanese post-apocalyptic films
Science fiction submarine films
Tokusatsu films
Toho films
Cold War films
1980s pregnancy films
Films scored by Kentarō Haneda
Japanese pregnancy films
1980s American films
1980s Japanese films